Western Whoopee is a 1930 animated short film directed by John Foster and Harry Bailey. It is part of the early cartoon series Aesop's Sound Fables. It was produced by The Van Beuren Corporation and released by the film company Pathé. It, like other Sound Fables at that time, features Milton and Rita, who resembles Mickey and Minnie Mouse greatly, so much so, Disney sued Van Beuren for the resemblance.

The film's sound was recorded on the RCA Photophone System, a company whose sound systems were used by Pathé during these time frame.

Copyrighted on April 10, 1930, and released three days later on the 13th. It was reviewed by several movie review magazines at that time, it was reviewed very positively by them. Also, even though they are called Aesop's Sound Fables, Aesop isn't mentioned anyway in these short animated films.

Plot

The film begins with Milton riding his horse comically around the West until he hears a wanted criminal roaming the West. Upon hearing this, Milton's mouse agrees to comically change to be the width of a twig, as a way of disguise. The criminal, who remains nameless throughout the entire short film, rides in front of a tree; and sees a Wanted sign with himself on it. He laughs, and comically shoots a skull and crossbones onto the other side, and afterwards; proceeds to ride off. Milton then blows a raspberry to the criminal, who then goes back to see what the noise was. The horse takes this opportunity to kick the criminal onto the floor. Milton and the horse both laugh, and then ride away. He rides to "The Last Chance Tavern", to people singing a song, with banjo accompaniment. In the bar, the pianist proceeds to play a waltz, which the bar begins to dance to. However, the lively enthusiastic attitude changes when the unnamed criminal returns to the bar, driving nearly everyone away. He walks around the bar, until coming to Milton playing Turkey in the Straw on the piano, who then finishes with Shave and a Haircut and pokes the criminal in the eye. This makes him spin with guns firing. Milton then proceeds to comically attach his underwear to the pianola (player piano), which in return, plays the same song. Rita laughs at the events, which angers the criminal enough for her to be kidnapped. After the criminal runs away with Rita, many cowboys seek to get her back, and end up chasing him. After arriving at a cliff-edge, the criminal gets his gun, and shoots every cowboy one-by-one. Milton survives the onslaught, as the criminal's gun jams. This begins a short chase, where Milton shoots the criminal off his horse. They begin to fence. Milton wins the fight, by comically cutting up the criminal like a potato, who then runs away. Milton then proceeds to comically eat the sword. Milton then grabs Rita, and dances with her. This ends with Rita passing out. Milton then proceeds to break the 4th wall, and tells the audience: Well? The film ends with Milton kissing Rita.

Characters
There are many characters in this short film, and just like the Sound Fables at that time, Milton is the main character, who is depicted as a heroic cowboy, who goes up against a tyrant. Rita is only seen in the final scene of the short, as a kidnapped damsel-in-distress. The wanted criminal is also an important character in the film, who is seen as a murdering tyrant. There is also many trivial characters, these include the bar pianist, and the other bar-goers; who dance to the pianist's music, some even playing other instruments; including the pan pipes.

Reception

Western Whoopee was released to critical acclaim by The Motion Picture News, Variety and The Film Daily. The Motion Picture News spoke very highly of the film, saying it is full of "laugh-provoking gags start-to-finish", and calling it "A splendid job", urging the cinema management to book it for their program. The Film Daily called it a "Fine Aesop Fable", even calling it "one of the best shorts in the series to date." Whilst Variety said that it was a refreshing break from Farmer Al Falfa, and said the film's story was "nonsensical and fantastic".

References

External links 

1930 films
1930s American animated films
1930 animated films
American black-and-white films
1930 short films